Eliot Hugo Curty (born 18 September 1998) is a French field hockey player.

Career

Club level
In club competition, Curty plays for Royal Orée in the Belgian Hockey League.

Les Bleus
Curty made his debut for Les Bleus in 2017 during a test series against Germany in Hamburg. 

In 2021 Curty competed at the EuroHockey Championships in Amsterdam. Later that year he was also named in the French squad for the season three of the FIH Pro League.

Junior national team
Eliot Curty made his debut for the French U–21 team in 2019 at the EuroHockey Junior Championship in Valencia, Spain.

References

External links

1998 births
Living people
French male field hockey players
Male field hockey midfielders
Place of birth missing (living people)
2023 Men's FIH Hockey World Cup players